Dandia Faizulla is a village in Nawabganj of Bareilly district, in Uttar Pradesh.

References

Bareilly district